The members of the 22nd Knesset were elected on 17 September 2019.

Members of the Knesset

Replacements

Notes

See also 
September 2019 Israeli legislative election

References

 
22